City Police is a 1993 Indian Malayalam film,  directed by Venu B Nair and produced by Palamuttam Majeed. The film stars Suresh Gopi, Geetha, Sukumari and P. C. George in the lead roles. The film has musical score by S. P. Venkatesh.

Plot
Arun Kumar's sister is abused and killed by a son of a political leader. When another political leader faces troubles with the other one, he makes arrangements to set free Arun, who was jailed using false evidences. Arun goes on killing spree with Inspector Sajan on his tail.

Cast

Suresh Gopi as Arun Kumar
Geetha as Dr Jessy
Sukumari as Sajan Mathew's mother
P. C. George
Mahesh as Jayan
Prathapachandran as DIG
Geetha Vijayan as Maya
Jagannatha Varma
KPAC Sunny
Kakka Ravi as Sajan Mathew
Mala Aravindan
Narayanankutty as Narayanankutty
T. S. Krishnan as Nandu
Neena Kurup

Soundtrack
The music was composed by S. P. Venkatesh.

References

External links
 

1993 films
1990s Malayalam-language films
Films scored by S. P. Venkatesh